Dewey is the name of two unincorporated communities in the U.S. state of Washington:

Dewey, Skagit County, Washington
Dewey, Whatcom County, Washington